

23001–23100 

|-id=002
| 23002 Jillhirsch ||  || Jill Hirsch, American mentor of a 2007 Intel Science Talent Search (ISTS) finalist || 
|-id=003
| 23003 Ziminski ||  || Mark Ziminski, American mentor of a 2007 Intel Science Talent Search (ISTS) finalist || 
|-id=006
| 23006 Pazden ||  || Stan Pazden, American mentor of a 2007 Intel Science Talent Search (ISTS) finalist || 
|-id=008
| 23008 Rebeccajohns ||  || Rebecca Johns, American mentor of a 2007 Intel Science Talent Search (ISTS) finalist || 
|-id=010
| 23010 Kathyfinch ||  || Kathy Finch, American mentor of a 2007 Intel Science Talent Search (ISTS) finalist || 
|-id=011
| 23011 Petach ||  || Helen Petach, American mentor of a 2007 Intel Science Talent Search (ISTS) finalist || 
|-id=013
| 23013 Carolsmyth ||  || Carol Smyth, American mentor of a 2007 Intel Science Talent Search (ISTS) finalist || 
|-id=014
| 23014 Walstein ||  || Eric Walstein, American mentor of a 2007 Intel Science Talent Search (ISTS) finalist || 
|-id=016
| 23016 Michaelroche ||  || Michael Roche, American mentor of a 2007 Intel Science Talent Search (ISTS) finalist || 
|-id=017
| 23017 Advincula ||  || Rigoberto Advincula, American mentor of a 2007 Intel Science Talent Search (ISTS) finalist || 
|-id=018
| 23018 Annmoriarty ||  || Ann Moriarty, American mentor of a 2007 Intel Science Talent Search (ISTS) finalist || 
|-id=019
| 23019 Thomgregory ||  || Thomas Gregory, American mentor of a 2007 Intel Science Talent Search (ISTS) finalist || 
|-id=030
| 23030 Jimkennedy ||  || James R. Kennedy (born 1941), an American radio astronomer of the University of Florida and a researcher at the former Arecibo Observatory in Puerto Rico. || 
|-id=032
| 23032 Fossey ||  || Dian Fossey, American ethologist || 
|-id=038
| 23038 Jeffbaughman ||  || Jeffrey Baughman, American mentor of a 2007 Intel Science Talent Search (ISTS) finalist || 
|-id=040
| 23040 Latham ||  || Robert Latham, American mentor of a 2007 Intel Science Talent Search (ISTS) finalist || 
|-id=041
| 23041 Hunt ||  || Patricia Hunt, American mentor of a 2007 Intel Science Talent Search (ISTS) finalist || 
|-id=042
| 23042 Craigpeters ||  || Craig Peters, American mentor of a 2007 Intel Science Talent Search (ISTS) finalist || 
|-id=044
| 23044 Starodub ||  || Peter Starodub, American mentor of a 2007 Intel Science Talent Search (ISTS) finalist || 
|-id=045
| 23045 Sarahocken ||  || Sarah Hocken, American mentor of a 2007 Intel Science Talent Search (ISTS) finalist || 
|-id=046
| 23046 Stevengordon ||  || Steven Gordon, American mentor of a 2007 Intel Science Talent Search (ISTS) finalist || 
|-id=047
| 23047 Isseroff ||  || Rebecca Isseroff, American mentor of a 2007 Intel Science Talent Search (ISTS) finalist || 
|-id=048
| 23048 Davidnelson ||  || David Nelson, American mentor of a 2007 Intel Science Talent Search (ISTS) finalist || 
|-id=054
| 23054 Thomaslynch ||  || Thomas Lynch, American mentor of a 2007 Intel Science Talent Search (ISTS) finalist || 
|-id=055
| 23055 Barbjewett ||  || Barbara Jewett, American mentor of a 2006 Intel Science Talent Search (ISTS) finalist || 
|-id=057
| 23057 Angelawilson ||  || Angela Wilson, American mentor of a 2005 Intel Science Talent Search (ISTS) finalist || 
|-id=059
| 23059 Paulpaino ||  || Paul Paino, American mentor of a 2005 Intel Science Talent Search (ISTS) finalist || 
|-id=060
| 23060 Shepherd ||  || Karen Shepherd, American mentor of a 2005 Intel Science Talent Search (ISTS) finalist || 
|-id=061
| 23061 Blueglass ||  || Michael Blueglass, American mentor of a 2004 Intel Science Talent Search (ISTS) finalist || 
|-id=062
| 23062 Donnamooney ||  || Donna Mooney, American mentor of a 2004 Intel Science Talent Search (ISTS) finalist || 
|-id=063
| 23063 Lichtman ||  || Paul Lichtman, American mentor of a 2004 Intel Science Talent Search (ISTS) finalist || 
|-id=064
| 23064 Mattmiller ||  || Matthew Miller, American mentor of a 2004 Discovery Channel Young Scientist Challenge (DCYSC) finalist || 
|-id=066
| 23066 Yihedong ||  || Yihe Dong, American winner of the 2007 Intel International Science and Engineering Fair (ISEF) || 
|-id=067
| 23067 Ishajain ||  || Isha Himani Jain, American winner of the 2007 Intel International Science and Engineering Fair (ISEF) || 
|-id=068
| 23068 Tyagi ||  || Sonika Tyagi, American finalist in the 2007 Intel International Science and Engineering Fair (ISEF) || 
|-id=069
| 23069 Kapps ||  || Michael Kapps, Canadian finalist in the 2007 Intel International Science and Engineering Fair (ISEF) || 
|-id=070
| 23070 Koussa ||  || Mounir Ahmad Koussa, American winner of the 2007 Intel International Science and Engineering Fair (ISEF) || 
|-id=071
| 23071 Tinaliu ||  || Tina Liu, American finalist in the 2007 Intel International Science and Engineering Fair (ISEF) || 
|-id=074
| 23074 Sarakirsch ||  || Sarah Kirsch, American finalist in the 2007 Intel International Science and Engineering Fair (ISEF) || 
|-id=079
| 23079 Munguia ||  || Scott Miguel Munguía, Mexican finalist in the 2007 Intel International Science and Engineering Fair (ISEF) || 
|-id=091
| 23091 Stansill ||  || Lacey Nicole Stansill, American finalist in the 2007 Intel International Science and Engineering Fair (ISEF) || 
|-id=096
| 23096 Mihika ||  || Mihika Pradhan, American winner of the 2007 Intel International Science and Engineering Fair (ISEF) || 
|-id=098
| 23098 Huanghuang ||  || Huang Huang, American finalist in the 2007 Intel International Science and Engineering Fair (ISEF) || 
|}

23101–23200 

|-id=102
| 23102 Dayanli ||  || Dayan Li (born 1989), American winner of the 2007 Intel International Science and Engineering Fair (ISEF) and Intel Foundation Young Scientist Award (IFYS) recipient || 
|-id=109
| 23109 Masayanagisawa ||  || Masahisa Yanagisawa (born 1955), planetary scientist at the University of Electro-Communications, Tokyo. || 
|-id=110
| 23110 Ericberne || 2000 AE || Eric Berne (1910–1970), Canadian physician and psychiatrist || 
|-id=111
| 23111 Fritzperls || 2000 AG || Fritz Perls (1893–1970), German psychologist and psychotherapist || 
|-id=113
| 23113 Aaronhakim ||  || Aaron Hakim (born 1991), Canadian finalist in the 2007 Intel International Science and Engineering Fair (ISEF) || 
|-id=115
| 23115 Valcourt ||  || James R. Valcourt (born 1989), American finalist in the 2007 Intel International Science and Engineering Fair (ISEF) || 
|-id=116
| 23116 Streich ||  || Philip Vidal Streich (born 1991), American winner of the 2007 Intel International Science and Engineering Fair (ISEF) and Intel Foundation Young Scientist Award (IFYS) recipient || 
|-id=120
| 23120 Paulallen ||  || Paul Allen (1953–2018), American computer industry executive and co-founded Microsoft, financial supporter of the Spacewatch program, of SpaceShipOne civilian suborbital space flight, and the radio-astronomy Allen Telescope Array (ATA) || 
|-id=121
| 23121 Michaelding ||  || Michael Ding (born 1990), American finalist in the 2007 Intel International Science and Engineering Fair (ISEF) || 
|-id=122
| 23122 Lorgat ||  || Raeez Lorgat (born 1990), South African winner of the 2007 Intel International Science and Engineering Fair (ISEF) || 
|-id=128
| 23128 Dorminy ||  || John Wilson Dorminy (born 1991), American finalist in the 2007 Intel International Science and Engineering Fair (ISEF) || 
|-id=131
| 23131 Debenedictis ||  || Erika Alden DeBenedictis (born 1992), American finalist in the 2007 Intel International Science and Engineering Fair (ISEF) || 
|-id=133
| 23133 Rishinbehl ||  || Rishin Behl (born 1989), Indian finalist in the 2007 Intel International Science and Engineering Fair (ISEF) || 
|-id=135
| 23135 Pheidas ||  || Pheidas, from Greek mythology. He was an Athenian warrior who fought to prevent Hector from reaching the Greek ships. || 
|-id=151
| 23151 Georgehotz ||  || George Francis Hotz (born 1989), American winner of the 2007 Intel International Science and Engineering Fair (ISEF) and Seaborg SIYSS Award (Stockholm International Youth Science Seminar) Award recipient || 
|-id=153
| 23153 Andrewnowell ||  || Andrew John Nowell (born 1988), English winner of the 2007 Intel International Science and Engineering Fair (ISEF) || 
|-id=155
| 23155 Judithblack ||  || Judith Black (born 1988), Northern Irish finalist in the 2007 Intel International Science and Engineering Fair (ISEF) || 
|-id=158
| 23158 Bouligny ||  || Ian Michael Bouligny (born 1990), American finalist in the 2007 Intel International Science and Engineering Fair (ISEF) || 
|-id=162
| 23162 Alexcrook ||  || Alexandra Elizabeth Crook (born 1989), American finalist in the 2007 Intel International Science and Engineering Fair (ISEF) || 
|-id=164
| 23164 Badger ||  || David Charles Griffiths Badger (born 1988), English finalist in the 2007 Intel International Science and Engineering Fair (ISEF) || 
|-id=165
| 23165 Kakinchan ||  || Ka Kin Chan (born 1988), Chinese (Hong Kong) winner of the 2007 Intel International Science and Engineering Fair (ISEF) || 
|-id=166
| 23166 Bilal ||  || Kulsum Bilal (born 1993), Pakistani finalist in the 2007 Intel International Science and Engineering Fair (ISEF) || 
|-id=168
| 23168 Lauriefletch ||  || Laurie Lea Fletcher (born 1989), American finalist in the 2007 Intel International Science and Engineering Fair (ISEF) || 
|-id=169
| 23169 Michikami ||  || Tatsuhiro Michikami (born 1971), a planetary scientist at Fukushima College of Technology, Japan. || 
|-id=172
| 23172 Williamartin ||  || William Campbell Martin (born 1989), American winner of the 2007 Intel International Science and Engineering Fair (ISEF) || 
|-id=173
| 23173 Hideaki ||  || Hideaki Miyamoto (born 1970), a planetary scientist at the University of Tokyo. || 
|-id=176
| 23176 Missacarvell ||  || Melissa Nicole Carvell (born 1990), American finalist in the 2007 Intel International Science and Engineering Fair (ISEF) || 
|-id=178
| 23178 Ghaben ||  || Alexandra L. Ghaben (born 1992), American finalist in the 2007 Intel International Science and Engineering Fair (ISEF) || 
|-id=179
| 23179 Niedermeyer ||  || Harper-Grace Niedermeyer (born 1991), American finalist in the 2007 Intel International Science and Engineering Fair (ISEF) || 
|-id=180
| 23180 Ryosuke ||  || Ryosuke Nakamura (born 1968), a remote-sensing specialist of the National Institute of Advanced Industrial Science and Technology, Tsukuba, Japan || 
|-id=182
| 23182 Siyaxuza ||  || Siyabulela Xuza (born 1989), South African winner of the 2007 International Science and Engineering Fair (ISEF) || 
|-id=190
| 23190 Klages-Mundt ||  || Ariah Aram Klages-Mundt (born 1989), American finalist in the 2007 Intel International Science and Engineering Fair (ISEF) || 
|-id=191
| 23191 Sujaytyle ||  || Sujay Tyle (born 1993), American finalist in the 2007 Intel International Science and Engineering Fair (ISEF) || 
|-id=192
| 23192 Caysvesterby ||  || Ashiyah Melyne Cays Vesterby (born 1990), American finalist in the 2007 Intel International Science and Engineering Fair (ISEF) || 
|-id=197
| 23197 Danielcook ||  || Daniel Kenneth Cook (born 1989), American finalist in the 2007 Intel International Science and Engineering Fair (ISEF) || 
|-id=198
| 23198 Norvell ||  || Leighton Marie Norvell (born 1989), American finalist in the 2007 Intel International Science and Engineering Fair (ISEF) || 
|-id=199
| 23199 Bezdek ||  || Daniel Karoly Bezdek (born 1990), Canadian finalist in the 2007 Intel International Science and Engineering Fair (ISEF) || 
|}

23201–23300 

|-id=204
| 23204 Arditkroni ||  || Ardit Kroni, Irish finalist in the 2007 Intel International Science and Engineering Fair (ISEF) || 
|-id=212
| 23212 Arkajitdey ||  || Arkajit Dey, American finalist in the 2007 Intel International Science and Engineering Fair (ISEF) || 
|-id=213
| 23213 Ameliachang ||  || Amelia Nong Shin Chang, Singaporean winner of the 2007 Intel International Science and Engineering Fair (ISEF) || 
|-id=214
| 23214 Patrickchen ||  || Patrick Ming Chen, American winner of the 2007 Intel International Science and Engineering Fair (ISEF) || 
|-id=216
| 23216 Mikehagler ||  || Michael David Hagler, American winner in the 2007 Intel International Science and Engineering Fair (ISEF) || 
|-id=217
| 23217 Nayana ||  || Nayana Ghosh-Choudhury, American finalist in the 2007 Intel International Science and Engineering Fair (ISEF) || 
|-id=218
| 23218 Puttachi ||  || Arun Puttachi, American finalist in the 2007 Intel International Science and Engineering Fair (ISEF) || 
|-id=220
| 23220 Yalemichaels ||  || Yale Stern Michaels, Canadian finalist in the 2007 Intel International Science and Engineering Fair (ISEF) || 
|-id=221
| 23221 Delgado ||  || Eric Nelson Delgado, American winner of the 2007 Intel International Science and Engineering Fair (ISEF) || 
|-id=228
| 23228 Nandinisarma ||  || Nandini Sarma, American winner of the 2007 Intel International Science and Engineering Fair (ISEF) || 
|-id=232
| 23232 Buschur ||  || Kristina Lynn Buschur, American finalist in the 2007 Intel International Science and Engineering Fair (ISEF) || 
|-id=234
| 23234 Lilliantsai ||  || Lillian Lee Tsai, American finalist in the 2007 Intel International Science and Engineering Fair (ISEF) || 
|-id=235
| 23235 Yingfan ||  || Ying Fan, American finalist in the 2007 Intel International Science and Engineering Fair (ISEF) || 
|-id=238
| 23238 Ocasio-Cortez ||  || Alexandria Ocasio-Cortez, American finalist in the 2007 Intel International Science and Engineering Fair (ISEF). Eleven years later, Ocasio-Cortez was elected in 2018 to the United States House of Representatives. || 
|-id=241
| 23241 Yada ||  || Toru Yada (born 1971), a planetary scientist at the Institute of Space and Astronautical Science at JAXA. || 
|-id=244
| 23244 Lafayette ||  || Recognized as a symbolic figure of French-American friendship, Marie-Josephe Paul Yves Roch Gilbert du Motier, Marquis de La Fayette (1757–1834), on his own initiative served as a general in the Continental Army during the American Revolution and as commander-in-chief of the Garde Nationale during the French Revolution || 
|-id=245
| 23245 Fujimura ||  || Akio Fujimura (born 1947), a planetary scientist and former professor at the Institute of Space and Astronautical Science at JAXA. || 
|-id=246
| 23246 Terazono ||  || Junya Terazono (born 1967) is a planetary scientist and information technology specialist. || 
|-id=248
| 23248 Batchelor ||  || Holly Reid Batchelor, Scottish winner of the 2007 Intel International Science and Engineering Fair (ISEF) || 
|-id=249
| 23249 Liaoyenting ||  || Liao Yen-Ting, Taiwanese finalist in the 2007 Intel International Science and Engineering Fair (ISEF) || 
|-id=254
| 23254 Chikatoshi ||  || Chikatoshi Honda, Japanese planetary scientist. || 
|-id=257
| 23257 Denny ||  || Robert B. Denny (born 1946), a robotic telescope software developer known for his "Pin Point Astrometry Engine" and the "ACP telescope control". || 
|-id=258
| 23258 Tsuihark ||  || Hark Tsui, Chinese (Hong Kong) movie producer and director † || 
|-id=259
| 23259 Miwadagakuen ||  || Miwada Gakuen is a girls' school, established by a Confucian, Masako Miwada (1843–1927), in 1887 to provide an opportunity for the education of women. The organizational meeting of the Japan Spaceguard Association was held in the hall of this school on 1996 Oct. 20 || 
|-id=262
| 23262 Thiagoolson ||  || Thiago David Olson, American finalist in the 2007 Intel International Science and Engineering Fair (ISEF) || 
|-id=265
| 23265 von Wurden ||  || Caroline Julia von Wurden, American finalist in the 2007 Intel International Science and Engineering Fair (ISEF) || 
|-id=270
| 23270 Kellerman ||  || Tanja Kellerman, South African winner of the 2007 Intel International Science and Engineering Fair (ISEF) || 
|-id=271
| 23271 Kellychacon ||  || Kelly Michelle Chacon, American finalist in the 2007 Intel International Science and Engineering Fair (ISEF) || 
|-id=274
| 23274 Wuminchun ||  || Wu Min-Chun, Taiwanese finalist in the 2007 Intel International Science and Engineering Fair (ISEF) || 
|-id=277
| 23277 Benhughes ||  || Benjamin Fitzroy Hughes, Australian finalist in the 2007 Intel International Science and Engineering Fair (ISEF) || 
|-id=279
| 23279 Chenhungjen ||  || Chen Hung-Jen, Taiwanese winner of the 2007 Intel International Science and Engineering Fair (ISEF) || 
|-id=280
| 23280 Laitsaita ||  || Lai Tsai-Ta, Taiwanese winner of the 2007 Intel International Science and Engineering Fair (ISEF) || 
|-id=281
| 23281 Vijayjain ||  || Vijay Jain, American winner of the 2007 Intel International Science and Engineering Fair (ISEF) || 
|-id=283
| 23283 Jinjuyi ||  || JinJu Yi, American winner of the 2007 Intel International Science and Engineering Fair (ISEF) || 
|-id=284
| 23284 Celik ||  || Burak Çelik, Turkish winner of the 2007 Intel International Science and Engineering Fair (ISEF) || 
|-id=286
| 23286 Parlakgul ||  || Güneş Parlakgül, Turkish winner of the 2007 Intel International Science and Engineering Fair (ISEF) || 
|-id=289
| 23289 Naruhirata ||  || Naru Hirata, Japanese planetary scientist. || 
|-id=294
| 23294 Sunao ||  || Sunao Hasegawa (born 1969) manages the two-stage light-gas guns facility at the Institute of Space and Astronautical Science at JAXA. The facility is used to study high-velocity impact processes. Hasegawa contributes asteroid observations made by the Japanese infrared satellite AKARI. || 
|-id=295
| 23295 Brandoreavis ||  || Brandon Lee Reavis, American winner of the 2007 Intel International Science and Engineering Fair (ISEF) || 
|-id=296
| 23296 Brianreavis ||  || Brian Christopher Reavis, American winner of the 2007 Intel International Science and Engineering Fair (ISEF) || 
|-id=298
| 23298 Loewenstein ||  || Jacob Charles Loewenstein, American winner of the 2007 Intel International Science and Engineering Fair (ISEF) || 
|}

23301–23400 

|-id=306
| 23306 Adamfields ||  || Adam Chaplin Fields, American winner of the 2007 Intel International Science and Engineering Fair (ISEF), (unrelated to American executive, entrepreneur Adam Fields) || 
|-id=307
| 23307 Alexramek ||  || Alex Shlomo Ramek, American winner of the 2007 Intel International Science and Engineering Fair (ISEF) || 
|-id=308
| 23308 Niyomsatian ||  || Korawich Niyomsatian, Thai winner of the 2007 Intel International Science and Engineering Fair (ISEF) and European Union Contest for Young Scientists (EUCYS) Award recipient || 
|-id=310
| 23310 Siriwon ||  || Natnaree Siriwon, Thai winner of the 2007 Intel International Science and Engineering Fair (ISEF) and European Union Contest for Young Scientists (EUCYS) Award recipient || 
|-id=313
| 23313 Supokaivanich ||  || Nathaphon Supokaivanich, Thai winner of the 2007 Intel International Science and Engineering Fair (ISEF) and European Union Contest for Young Scientists (EUCYS) Award recipient || 
|-id=315
| 23315 Navinbrian ||  || Navin Brian Ramakrishna, Singaporean finalist in the 2007 Intel International Science and Engineering Fair (ISEF) || 
|-id=318
| 23318 Salvadorsanchez ||  || Salvador Sánchez Martínez, Spanish (Catalan) amateur astronomer, Director of the Observatori Astronòmic de Mallorca. || 
|-id=322
| 23322 Duyingsewa ||  || Du Ying Sewa, Singaporean finalist in the 2007 Intel International Science and Engineering Fair (ISEF) || 
|-id=323
| 23323 Anand ||  || Vikas Anand, American finalist in the 2007 Intel International Science and Engineering Fair (ISEF) || 
|-id=324
| 23324 Kwak ||  || Esther Bora Kwak, American finalist in the 2007 Intel International Science and Engineering Fair (ISEF) || 
|-id=325
| 23325 Arroyo ||  || Alejandro Arroyo, Mexican finalist in the 2007 Intel International Science and Engineering Fair (ISEF) || 
|-id=327
| 23327 Luchernandez ||  || Lucero Hernández, Mexican finalist in the 2007 Intel International Science and Engineering Fair (ISEF) || 
|-id=329
| 23329 Josevega ||  || José Carlos Vega, Mexican finalist in the 2007 Intel International Science and Engineering Fair (ISEF) || 
|-id=331
| 23331 Halimzeidan ||  || Sana Abdul Halim Zeidan, Lebanese finalist in the 2007 Intel International Science and Engineering Fair (ISEF) || 
|-id=355
| 23355 Elephenor || 9602 P-L || Elephenor, son of Chalcodon, led the Euboean Abantians against Troy, where he was killed by Agenor. || 
|-id=382
| 23382 Epistrophos || 4536 T-2 || Skhedios and Epistrophos led the men of Phocis against Troy. || 
|-id=383
| 23383 Schedios || 5146 T-2 || Schedios and Epistrophos led the men of Phocis against Troy. || 
|}

23401–23500 

|-
| 23401 Brodskaya ||  || Vera Yakovlevna Brodskaya (born 1923) worked at the Pulkovo Observatory for more than 30 years. As librarian and curator of the library fund she was the initiator and main compiler of The Catalogue of editions of astronomical observatories of the world available in the Pulkovo Observatory library || 
|-id=402
| 23402 Turchina ||  || Galina Petrovna Turchina (born 1937), a Russian writer and dramatist || 
|-id=403
| 23403 Boudewijnbuch || 1971 FB || Boudewijn Maria Ignatius Büch (1948–2002) was a Dutch writer, poet and television presenter. He is well known for his successful novel De kleine blonde dood ("Little blond death", 1985), on which a film was based in 1993. The name was suggested by C. E. Koppeschaar || 
|-id=404
| 23404 Bomans || 1972 RG || Godfried Jan Arnold Bomans (1913–1971) was a popular Dutch author known for his books of modern-day fairy tales and his short, humorous pieces full of parody and acerbic wit. His young-adult fantasy novel Eric in the Land of the Insects (1940) was turned into a film in 2004. The name was suggested by L. E. Timmerman || 
|-id=405
| 23405 Nisyros ||  || Nisyros is the easternmost volcano of the Aegean arc of Greece. || 
|-id=406
| 23406 Kozlov ||  || Dmitrij Il'ich Kozlov (1919–), Russian engineer and scientist, winner of the Lenin Prize, of the State Prize twice, and the gold medal of the Association of Assistance to the National Industry of France || 
|-id=408
| 23408 Beijingaoyun ||  || Chinese for the Beijing Olympic Games, after the 2008 Beijing Olympics || 
|-id=409
| 23409 Derzhavin ||  || Gavrila Romanovich Derzhavin (1743–1816) was a great Russian poet, the immediate predecessor of Pushkin. In his verses he glorified the Russian war victories of the eighteenth century. He was also the author of striking satirical verses, as well as lyrics about love and landscapes || 
|-id=410
| 23410 Vikuznetsov ||  || Victor Ivanovich Kuznetsov (1913–1991) a Russian space engineer || 
|-id=411
| 23411 Bayanova ||  || Alla Nikolaevna Bayanova (Levitskaya) (1914–2011) is a Romanian, Soviet and Russian singer, performer of Russian songs and romances, author of music for many romances. || 
|-id=436
| 23436 Alekfursenko ||  || Aleksandr Fursenko (1927–2008), Russian historian || 
|-id=437
| 23437 Šíma ||  || Josef Šíma (1891–1971) was a Czech imaginative, abstract and surrealist painter, who lived in France from 1921. His sources of inspiration spanned nature, crystals, cosmic visions, landscape and female bodies, to fascination by stories of ancient mythology such as Falling Icarus or Leda and the Swan || 
|-id=443
| 23443 Kikwaya ||  || Jean Baptiste Kikwaya Eluo (born 1965), a native of the Democratic Republic of Congo and Staff Astronomer at the Vatican Observatory. || 
|-id=444
| 23444 Kukučín ||  || Martin Kukučín (pseudonym of Matej Bencur), Slovak writer. || 
|-id=450
| 23450 Birkenstock ||  || Charles Birkenstock (c. 1860–1928) was the director of the Bureau Central Météorique (founded in 1910) and the Société astronomique d´Anvers (founded in 1905). || 
|-id=452
| 23452 Drew || 1988 QF || Drew Barringer (born 1946), president of the Barringer Crater Company in Arizona where the Meteor Crater is located || 
|-id=455
| 23455 Fumi ||  || Fumi Yoshida (born 1966), a Japanese astronomer. She studied the size distributions of sub-kilometer asteroids with the Subaru Telescope at the Mauna Kea Observatory on Hawaii in collaboration with Tsuko Nakamura, who discovered this minor planet. || 
|-id=457
| 23457 Beiderbecke ||  || Bix Beiderbecke, jazz musician. || 
|-id=465
| 23465 Yamashitakouhei ||  || Kouhei Yamashita (born 1953) was the project manager of the successfully launched STARS-II nanosatellite, built at Kagawa University in Japan. He is also an astrophotographer of nebulae and star clusters. || 
|-id=468
| 23468 Kannabe ||  || Kannabe, a plateau in Toyooka city, Hyogo prefecture.  || 
|-id=469
| 23469 Neilpeart ||  || Neil Elwood Peart, Canadian drummer and lyricist for the band Rush || 
|-id=471
| 23471 Kawatamasaaki ||  || Masaaki Kawata (born 1964) is the director of the Oita Sekizaki Kaiseikan (Observatory and Museum). He makes nightly contributions to his local community by operating the observatory's 0.6-m reflector telescope and contributes to public outreach of astronomy. || 
|-id=472
| 23472 Rolfriekher ||  || Rolf Riekher (1922–2020), a German optician and historian, author of "Telescopes and their Masters" (Fernrohre und ihre Meister). (Src) || 
|-id=473
| 23473 Voss ||  || Johann Heinrich Voss (1751–1826), a German philologist and poet || 
|-id=475
| 23475 Nakazawa ||  || Satoru Nakazawa (born 1969), an aerospace system engineer at the Japan Aerospace Exploration Agency (JAXA), who contributed to the Selenological and Engineering Explorer, Mercury Magnetospheric Orbiter, and Hayabusa2, which took samples from asteroid 162173 Ryugu. || 
|-id=477
| 23477 Wallenstadt ||  || Lake Walen, also known as Walensee or Lake Walenstadt, is one of the greater lakes in Switzerland. || 
|-id=478
| 23478 Chikumagawa || 1991 BZ || The Chikumagawa River originates in Nagano prefecture and flows through Niigata prefecture with many historic sites lying along it. Chikumagawa Ryojo no Uta (A poem of a journey along the River Chikuma) is a widely-known poem written by the prominent Japanese novelist and poet Shimazaki Toson. || 
|-id=490
| 23490 Monikohl ||  || Monika Kohl, German secretary of the documentation department of the Astronomisches Rechen-Institut for more than four decades || 
|-id=495
| 23495 Nagaotoshiko ||  || Toshiko Nagao (1939–2021), was a Japanese amateur astronomer and astronomy communicator. She also assisted Kazuro Watanabe, who co-discovered this minor planet. || 
|}

23501–23600 

|-id=504
| 23504 Haneda || 1992 EX || Toshio Haneda (1910–1992), a Japanese comet hunter, discoverer of D/1978 R1 (Haneda-Campos) || 
|-id=514
| 23514 Schneider || 1992 RU || Reinhold Schneider, a German writer and essayist. || 
|-id=520
| 23520 Ludwigbechstein ||  || Ludwig Bechstein, German writer and collector of folk fairy tales. || 
|-id=524
| 23524 Yuichitsuda ||  || Yuichi Tsuda (born 1975) is a Japanese space engineer, pioneer of solar-sail technology used in the IKAROS mission, and project manager on the Hayabusa2 asteroid sample-return mission. || 
|-id=543
| 23543 Saiki || 1993 UK || Takanao Saiki (born 1976) is a Japanese aerospace engineering at the Institute of Space and Astronautical Science, who developed the Hayabusa2 impactor, which created an artificial crater on the surface of asteroid 162173 Ryugu in 2019. || 
|-id=547
| 23547 Tognelli || 1994 DG || Emanuele Tognelli (born 1981), an Italian amateur astronomer at the Pistoia Mountains Astronomical Observatory in San Marcello Piteglio, Tuscany || 
|-id=549
| 23549 Epicles ||  || Epicles, a Lycian warrior fighting for the Trojan forces, was killed by Ajax, who hit him on the head with a heavy stone || 
|-id=562
| 23562 Hyodokenichi ||  || Kenichi Hyodo (born 1967) is a well-known amateur astronomer in Ehime Prefecture and keen observer and photographer of comets, nebulae and star clusters. He is currently a member of the Oriental Astronomical Association and Astronomical Society of Oita. || 
|-id=564
| 23564 Ungaretti ||  || Giuseppe Ungaretti (1888–1970), a poet of Hermeticism || 
|-id=571
| 23571 Zuaboni || 1995 AB || 23571 Zuaboni Discovered 1995 Jan. 1 by M. Cavagna and E. Galliani at Sormano. Patrizia Zuaboni (born 1958), an affectionate friend of both discoverers, contributed to the idea that they should get married || 
|-id=578
| 23578 Baedeker ||  || Karl Baedeker, German publisher. || 
|-id=583
| 23583 Křivský ||  || Ladislav Krivský (1925–), a Czech astronomer and meteorologist || 
|-id=587
| 23587 Abukumado ||  || Abukuma-do, a limestone cave in eastern Fukushima prefecture || 
|}

23601–23700 

|-id=608
| 23608 Alpiapuane ||  || Alpi Apuane, the marble mountains, are one of the most original relief areas in Italy, known for the variety of its landscape and environment. Its precious Carrara marble is known worldwide. The presence of ancient human settlements has left important historical and cultural witness. The name was suggested by M. Di Martino. || 
|-id=612
| 23612 Ramzel ||  || Allen Lee Ramzel, defunct (?) observer and systems engineer for the team that discovered this object || 
|-id=617
| 23617 Duna ||  || Ancient name of the Daugava river, upon which the Latvian capital of Riga is built. || 
|-id=625
| 23625 Gelfond || 1996 WX || Alexandr Osipovich Gelfond (1906–1968) studied and taught mathematics at the University of Moscow. His main contributions were in the theory of interpolation and approximation of functions of a complex variable, in number theory and the study of transcendental numbers and in the history of mathematics. || 
|-id=628
| 23628 Ichimura ||  || Yoshimi Ichimura (born 1952) is an active Japanese amateur astronomer and high-school teacher. He discovered comet C/1987 W1 (Ichimura), as well as the supernovae 2005lx, 2007ss, 2008A and 2008hi || 
|-id=638
| 23638 Nagano ||  || Nagano Prefecture lies in the center of Honshu Island, Japan. It shares borders with eight prefectures, the most in Japan. In 1998 the 18th Winter Olympic Games were held there. || 
|-id=644
| 23644 Yamaneko ||  || Yamaneko Group of Comet Observers. || 
|-id=648
| 23648 Kolář || 1997 CB || Czech amateur astronomer and telecommunication engineer Jan Kolář (born 1936) served for decades as chairman of the Optical Group of the Czech Astronomical Society and was elected an honorary fellow of the Society in 2001. He constructed "Bikukr", a pair of telescopes for high-quality deep-sky visual observation. || 
|-id=649
| 23649 Tohoku ||  || Tohoku is the name of the northeastern part of Honshu island, Japan. The Great East Japan Earthquake of 2011 March 11 occurred offshore. About 25000 lives were lost and many facilities were demolished || 
|-id=650
| 23650 Čvančara ||  || Jaroslav Čvančara (born 1948), a Czech writer, historian and musician. || 
|-id=663
| 23663 Kalou ||  || Nickname of the discoverer's wife, Caroline Meunie. || 
|-id=667
| 23667 Savinakim ||  || Savina Dine Kim (born 1994) is a finalist in the 2012 Intel Science Talent Search, a science competition for high-school seniors, for her biochemistry project. || 
|-id=668
| 23668 Eunbekim ||  || EunBe Kim (born 1993) is a finalist in the 2012 Intel Science Talent Search, a science competition for high-school seniors, for her biochemistry project. || 
|-id=669
| 23669 Huihuifan ||  || Huihui Fan (born 1994) is a finalist in the 2012 Intel Science Talent Search, a science competition for high-school seniors, for her plant-science project. || 
|-id=672
| 23672 Swiggum ||  || Leslie Swiggum mentored a finalist in the 2012 Intel Science Talent Search, a science competition for high-school seniors. || 
|-id=673
| 23673 Neilmehta ||  || Neil Kamlesh Mehta (born 1994) is a finalist in the 2012 Intel Science Talent Search, a science competition for high-school seniors, for his biochemistry project. || 
|-id=674
| 23674 Juliebaker ||  || Julie Baker mentored a finalist in the 2012 Intel Science Talent Search, a science competition for high-school seniors. || 
|-id=675
| 23675 Zabinski ||  || Urszula Zabinski mentored a finalist in the 2012 Intel Science Talent Search, a science competition for high-school seniors. || 
|-id=679
| 23679 Andrewmoore ||  || Andrew Moore mentored a finalist in the 2012 Intel Science Talent Search, a science competition for high-school seniors. || 
|-id=680
| 23680 Kerryking ||  || Kerry King mentored a finalist in the 2012 Intel Science Talent Search, a science competition for high-school seniors. || 
|-id=681
| 23681 Prabhu ||  || Anirudh Prabhu (born 1994) is a finalist in the 2012 Intel Science Talent Search, a science competition for high-school seniors, for his mathematics project. || 
|-id=685
| 23685 Toaldo || 1997 JV || Giuseppe Toaldo (1719–1797), Italian Catholic priest, meteorologist, agronomist, astronomer and physicist || 
|-id=686
| 23686 Songyuan ||  || Songyuan, Jilin province, China || 
|-id=688
| 23688 Josephjoachim ||  || Joseph Joachim (1831–1907) was a Hungarian violist, conductor and composer, and a close friend of Mendelssohn and Brahms. He is known for his revival of Bach's sonatas for violin solo || 
|-id=689
| 23689 Jancuypers ||  || Jan Cuypers (1956–2017) was an astronomer working at the Royal Observatory at Uccle. Involved in several public and astronomical duties at the observatory, he was very much appreciated by all his colleagues. || 
|-id=691
| 23691 Jefneve ||  || Jef Neve (born 1977) is a Belgian jazz and classical music pianist. A 2000 graduate of the Lemmens Institute in Leuven, he wrote the soundtrack for the 2012 VRT series "In Vlaamse Velden" ("In Flandern Fields"). || 
|-id=692
| 23692 Nandatianwenners || 1997 KA || The graduates and faculties of the Department of Astronomy of Nanjing University ("Nanda") on the occasion of its 120th anniversary for their contribution to astronomy ("Tianwen", from the I Ching). || 
|-id=699
| 23699 Paulgordan ||  || Paul Gordan (1837–1912), German mathematician || 
|}

23701–23800 

|-
| 23701 Liqibin ||  || Li Qibin (1936–2003), the director of the Beijing Astronomical Observatory (1987–1998) and twice president of the Chinese Astronomical Society (1989–1992 and 1995–1998). || 
|-id=707
| 23707 Chambliss ||  || Carlson R. Chambliss (born 1941) is an astronomer and Emeritus Professor at Kutztown University in Kutztown, Pennsylvania. He has written books on numismatics, philately, and blackjack, and created and sponsored numerous awards in his name honoring achievements in academia and science, especially astronomy. || 
|-id=712
| 23712 Willpatrick || 1998 AA || William Patrick Dillon (born 1992), son of the American discoverers Elizabeth and William G. Dillon. He was with them on the discovery night: "Daddy, I want to go home now. This place is cold and spooky." "Just one more image, son. Keep your eyes on the heavens!" || 
|-id=717
| 23717 Kaddoura ||  || Deena Wafic Kaddoura, Lebanese finalist in the 2007 Intel International Science and Engineering Fair (ISEF) || 
|-id=718
| 23718 Horgos ||  || Horgoš, a Serbian village near the border to Hungary, where the second discoverer, László L. Kiss grew up. The population is mainly Hungarian and numbers almost 8000. || 
|-id=722
| 23722 Gulak ||  || Benjamin Poss Gulak, Canadian finalist in the 2007 Intel International Science and Engineering Fair (ISEF) || 
|-id=727
| 23727 Akihasan ||  || Akihasan mountain is located north of Nanyo-city, Yamagata prefecture, Japan. The mountain is popular as a hiking course || 
|-id=728
| 23728 Jasonmorrow ||  || Jason Charles Morrow, Canadian finalist in the 2007 Intel International Science and Engineering Fair (ISEF) || 
|-id=729
| 23729 Kemeisha ||  || Kemeisha Latoya Nastasia Patterson, American finalist in the 2007 Intel International Science and Engineering Fair (ISEF) || 
|-id=730
| 23730 Suncar ||  || Jonathan Kelvin Suncar, American finalist in the 2007 Intel International Science and Engineering Fair (ISEF) || 
|-id=732
| 23732 Choiseungjae ||  || Choi Seung Jae, Chinese finalist in the 2007 Intel International Science and Engineering Fair (ISEF) || 
|-id=733
| 23733 Hyojiyun ||  || Hyo Ji Yun, Chinese finalist in the 2007 Intel International Science and Engineering Fair (ISEF) || 
|-id=734
| 23734 Kimgyehyun ||  || Kim Gye Hyun, Chinese finalist in the 2007 Intel International Science and Engineering Fair (ISEF) || 
|-id=735
| 23735 Cohen ||  || Julia Lynn Cohen, American finalist in the 2007 Intel International Science and Engineering Fair (ISEF) || 
|-id=738
| 23738 van Zyl ||  || Jakob "Japie" van Zyl (1957–2020) was a pioneer in understanding the Earth system using remote sensing data. A prolific researcher, passionate mentor, and outstanding leader, Jakob rose throughout his 33-year JPL career to become Director of Solar System Exploration and Associate Director of JPL for Strategy. || 
|-id=739
| 23739 Kevin ||  || Kevin Schindler (born 1964) is outreach manager at Lowell Observatory. He oversees all aspects of Lowell's education and outreach programs, including personnel, programming, exhibits and gift shop || 
|-id=741
| 23741 Takaaki ||  || Takaaki Noguchi (born 1961), a professor at Ibaraki University, Bunkyo, Japan. || 
|-id=742
| 23742 Okadatatsuaki ||  || Tatsuaki Okada (born 1968), an associate professor at the Institute of Space and Astronautical Science, JAXA. || 
|-id=743
| 23743 Toshikasuga ||  || Toshihiro Kasuga (born 1977), an astronomer at the National Astronomical Observatory of Japan. || 
|-id=744
| 23744 Ootsubo ||  || Takafumi Ootsubo (born 1970), an associate professor at Tohoku University. || 
|-id=745
| 23745 Liadawley ||  || Lia Elgia Dawley, American finalist in the 2007 Intel International Science and Engineering Fair (ISEF) || 
|-id=747
| 23747 Rahaelgupta ||  || Rahael Rohini Gupta, American finalist in the 2007 Intel International Science and Engineering Fair (ISEF) || 
|-id=748
| 23748 Kaarethode ||  || Kaare Thode Jørgensen, Danish finalist in the 2007 Intel International Science and Engineering Fair (ISEF) || 
|-id=749
| 23749 Thygesen ||  || Jakob Refer Thygesen, Danish finalist in the 2007 Intel International Science and Engineering Fair (ISEF) || 
|-id=750
| 23750 Stepciechan ||  || Stephanie Fulane Chan, American finalist in the 2007 Intel International Science and Engineering Fair (ISEF) || 
|-id=751
| 23751 Davidprice ||  || David Michael Price, American finalist in the 2007 Intel International Science and Engineering Fair (ISEF) || 
|-id=752
| 23752 Jacobshapiro ||  || Jacob J. Shapiro, American finalist in the 2007 Intel International Science and Engineering Fair (ISEF) || 
|-id=753
| 23753 Busdicker ||  || Elizabeth Wells Busdicker, American finalist in the 2007 Intel International Science and Engineering Fair (ISEF) || 
|-id=754
| 23754 Rachnareddy ||  || Rachna Beeravolu Reddy, American finalist in the 2007 Intel International Science and Engineering Fair (ISEF) || 
|-id=755
| 23755 Sergiolozano ||  || Sergio Lozano, American finalist in the 2007 Intel International Science and Engineering Fair (ISEF) || 
|-id=756
| 23756 Daniellozano ||  || Daniel Lozano, American finalist in the 2007 Intel International Science and Engineering Fair (ISEF) || 
|-id=757
| 23757 Jonmunoz ||  || Jonathan Muñoz, American finalist in the 2007 Intel International Science and Engineering Fair (ISEF) || 
|-id=758
| 23758 Guyuzhou ||  || Gu Yuzhou, Chinese finalist in the 2007 Intel International Science and Engineering Fair (ISEF) || 
|-id=759
| 23759 Wangzhaoxin ||  || Wang Zhaoxin, Chinese finalist in the 2007 Intel International Science and Engineering Fair (ISEF) || 
|-id=761
| 23761 Yangliqing ||  || Yang Liqing, Chinese finalist in the 2007 Intel International Science and Engineering Fair (ISEF) || 
|-id=768
| 23768 Abu-Rmaileh ||  || Muhammad Akef Abu-Rmaileh, American finalist in the 2007 Discovery Channel Young Scientist Challenge (DCYSC) || 
|-id=769
| 23769 Russellbabb ||  || Russell S. Babb, American finalist in the 2007 Discovery Channel Young Scientist Challenge (DCYSC) || 
|-id=771
| 23771 Emaitchar ||  || Martin H. Robinson (born 1952) is a clinical oncologist, based in Sheffield, U.K. An enthusiastic amateur astronomer, he was for many years clinical director of Weston Park Hospital. The name derives from transliteration of his initials (MHR), by which he is known to his colleagues. || 
|-id=772
| 23772 Masateru ||  || Masateru Ishiguro (born 1971), an assistant professor at Seoul National University. || 
|-id=773
| 23773 Sarugaku ||  || Yuki Sarugaku (born 1978), now at the Japan Aerospace Exploration Agency, Tokyo, recently completed his doctoral dissertation at the University of Tokyo on the dust trails of comets. || 
|-id=774
| 23774 Herbelliott ||  || Herb Elliott (born 1938), Australian athlete who won gold by a wide margin in the 1500-m at the 1960 Olympics with a record that stood for seven years. At 22 he retired having never been beaten over the mile equivalent distance. He has been voted by his peers as history's greatest middle distance runner. || 
|-id=775
| 23775 Okudaira || 1998 PE || Kyoko Okudaira (born 1973), a Japanese planetary scientist. || 
|-id=776
| 23776 Gosset || 1998 QE || William Sealy Gosset (1876–1937), British mathematician and chemist at Oxford. His most important contribution, published under the pseudonym "Student", was the derivation of a statistic, known as "t", that plays a central role in tests of hypotheses based on the analysis of small samples. || 
|-id=777
| 23777 Goursat ||  || Édouard Goursat (1858–1936), French mathematician who made contributions to many areas of mathematical analysis. He was associated with several French universities and was regarded as an outstanding teacher. His monumental Cours d´analyse mathématique (1900–1910) was used by generations of students. || 
|-id=779
| 23779 Cambier ||  || Colleen Siobahn Cambier, American finalist in the 2007 Discovery Channel Young Scientist Challenge (DCYSC) || 
|-id=783
| 23783 Alyssachan ||  || Alyssa Lauren Chan, American finalist in the 2007 Discovery Channel Young Scientist Challenge (DCYSC) || 
|-id=788
| 23788 Cofer ||  || Evan Mitchell Cofer, American finalist in the 2007 Discovery Channel Young Scientist Challenge (DCYSC) || 
|-id=791
| 23791 Kaysonconlin ||  || Kayson Levi Conlin, American finalist in the 2007 Discovery Channel Young Scientist Challenge (DCYSC) || 
|-id=792
| 23792 Alyssacook ||  || Alyssa Noel Cook, American finalist in the 2007 Discovery Channel Young Scientist Challenge (DCYSC) || 
|-id=798
| 23798 Samagonzalez ||  || Samantha Gonzalez, American finalist in the 2007 Discovery Channel Young Scientist Challenge (DCYSC) || 
|}

23801–23900 

|-
| 23801 Erikgustafson ||  || Erik Olaf Gustafson, a finalist in the 2007 Discovery Channel Young Scientist Challenge (DCYSC), a middle school science competition, for his environmental sciences project. || 
|-id=804
| 23804 Haber ||  || Catherine Michelle Haber, a finalist in the 2007 Discovery Channel Young Scientist Challenge (DCYSC), a middle school science competition, for her behavioral science project. || 
|-id=808
| 23808 Joshuahammer ||  || Joshua Wayne Hammer, a finalist in the 2007 Discovery Channel Young Scientist Challenge (DCYSC), a middle school science competition, for his biochem, medicine, health, and microbiology project. || 
|-id=809
| 23809 Haswell ||  || John Douglas Reiji Haswell, a finalist in the 2007 Discovery Channel Young Scientist Challenge (DCYSC), a middle school science competition, for his biochem, medicine, health, and microbiology project. || 
|-id=811
| 23811 Connorivens ||  || Connor Joseph Ivens, a finalist in the 2007 Discovery Channel Young Scientist Challenge (DCYSC), a middle school science competition, for his physical science project. || 
|-id=812
| 23812 Jannuzi ||  || Brigg Lowell Jannuzi, a finalist in the 2007 Discovery Channel Young Scientist Challenge (DCYSC), a middle school science competition, for his earth and space science project. || 
|-id=814
| 23814 Bethanylynne ||  || Bethany Lynne Johnson, a finalist in the 2007 Discovery Channel Young Scientist Challenge (DCYSC), a middle school science competition, for her biochem, medicine, health, and microbiology project. || 
|-id=816
| 23816 Rohitkamat ||  || Rohit G. Kamat, a finalist in the 2007 Discovery Channel Young Scientist Challenge (DCYSC), a middle school science competition, for his botany and zoology project. || 
|-id=817
| 23817 Gokulk ||  || Gokul Krishnan, a finalist in the 2007 Discovery Channel Young Scientist Challenge (DCYSC), a middle school science competition, for his biochem, medicine, health, and microbiology project. || 
|-id=818
| 23818 Matthewlepow ||  || Matthew Brice Lepow, a finalist in the 2007 Discovery Channel Young Scientist Challenge (DCYSC), a middle school science competition, for his earth and space science project. || 
|-id=819
| 23819 Tsuyoshi ||  || Tsuyoshi Terai (born 1983), Japanese researcher, of the National Astronomical Observatory of Japan. || 
|-id=821
| 23821 Morganmonroe ||  || Morgan McKay Monroe, a finalist in the 2007 Discovery Channel Young Scientist Challenge (DCYSC), a middle school science competition, for her physical science project. || 
|-id=831
| 23831 Mattmooney ||  || Matthew Michael Mooney, a finalist in the 2007 Discovery Channel Young Scientist Challenge (DCYSC), a middle school science competition, for his environmental sciences project. || 
|-id=833
| 23833 Mowers ||  || Christopher Scott Mowers, a finalist in the 2007 Discovery Channel Young Scientist Challenge (DCYSC), a middle school science competition, for his physical science project. || 
|-id=834
| 23834 Mukhopadhyay ||  || Prithwis Kumar Mukhopadhyay, a finalist in the 2007 Discovery Channel Young Scientist Challenge (DCYSC), a middle school science competition, for his environmental sciences project. || 
|-id=837
| 23837 Matthewnanni ||  || Matthew James Nanni, a finalist in the 2007 Discovery Channel Young Scientist Challenge (DCYSC), a middle school science competition, for his botany and zoology project. || 
|-id=844
| 23844 Raghvendra ||  || Shubha Srinivas Raghvendra, a finalist in the 2007 Discovery Channel Young Scientist Challenge (DCYSC), a middle school science competition, for her behavioral science project. || 
|-id=850
| 23850 Ramaswami ||  || Keshav Ramaswami, a finalist in the 2007 Discovery Channel Young Scientist Challenge (DCYSC), a middle school science competition, for his biochem, medicine, health, and microbiology project. || 
|-id=851
| 23851 Rottman-Yang ||  || Jaron Shalom Rottman-Yang, a finalist in the 2007 Discovery Channel Young Scientist Challenge (DCYSC), a middle school science competition, for his biochem, medicine, health, and microbiology project. || 
|-id=852
| 23852 Laurierumker ||  || Laurie Ann Rumker, a finalist in the 2007 Discovery Channel Young Scientist Challenge (DCYSC), a middle school science competition, for her biochem, medicine, health, and microbiology project. || 
|-id=854
| 23854 Rickschaffer ||  || Rick Schinco Schaffer, a finalist in the 2007 Discovery Channel Young Scientist Challenge (DCYSC), a middle school science competition, for his botany and zoology project. || 
|-id=855
| 23855 Brandonshih ||  || Brandon H. Shih, a finalist in the 2007 Discovery Channel Young Scientist Challenge (DCYSC), a middle school science competition, for his environmental sciences project. || 
|-id=858
| 23858 Ambrosesoehn ||  || Ambrose Geoffrey Soehn, a finalist in the 2007 Discovery Channel Young Scientist Challenge (DCYSC), a middle school science competition, for his physical science project. || 
|-id=861
| 23861 Benjaminsong ||  || Benjamin Paul Song, American finalist in the 2007 Discovery Channel Young Scientist Challenge (DCYSC), a middle school science competition, for his biochem, medicine, health, and microbiology project. || 
|-id=865
| 23865 Karlsorensen ||  || Karl Mikael Sorensen, American finalist in the 2007 Discovery Channel Young Scientist Challenge (DCYSC), a middle school science competition, for his botany and zoology project. || 
|-id=867
| 23867 Cathsoto ||  || Catherine Soto, American finalist in the 2007 Discovery Channel Young Scientist Challenge (DCYSC), a middle school science competition, for her biochem, medicine, health, and microbiology project. || 
|-id=875
| 23875 Strube ||  || Katherine Michaela Strube, American finalist in the 2007 Discovery Channel Young Scientist Challenge (DCYSC), a middle school science competition, for her physical science project. || 
|-id=877
| 23877 Gourmaud || 1998 SP || Jamy Gourmaud, French journalist, co-host of the television science program C'est pas sorcier (see also 23882, 23890) || 
|-id=879
| 23879 Demura ||  || Hirohide Demura, Japanese lunar and planetary scientist. || 
|-id=880
| 23880 Tongil ||  || Korean reunification (Tongil is the Korean word for reunification). The asteroid was named with the hope for an early reunification of the southern and northern parts of Korea, divided since 1945. It was the first minor-planet discovery by a Korean amateur astronomer. Src || 
|-id=882
| 23882 Fredcourant ||  || Frédéric "Fred" Courant, French journalist, co-host of the television science program C'est pas sorcier (see also 23877, 23890) || 
|-id=884
| 23884 Karenharvey ||  || Karen Lorraine Harvey (born 1942; née Angle), an American astrophysicist who has investigated extensively the relationship of solar magnetic fields to coronal heating, x-ray emission, large active regions, ephemeral active regions and the solar cycle. Her work has provided fundamental statistical data on the nature and evolution of the solar magnetic field. She is married to American astrophysicist John Warren Harvey. || 
|-id=886
| 23886 Toshihamane ||  || Toshihiko Hamane (born 1963), curator of the Gunma Astronomical Observatory  in Japan. He assisted Yoshihide Kozai, director of GAO from 1997 to 2012, especially in the field of school education of astronomy and planetary science. He is also a popularizer of astronomy. || 
|-id=887
| 23887 Shinsukeabe ||  || Shinsuke Abe (born 1970), a pioneer in modern meteoroid and asteroid research. || 
|-id=888
| 23888 Daikinoshita ||  || Kinoshita Daisuke (born 1974), of the Institute of Astronomy at the National Central University, Taiwan, studies asteroids and comets. He has also worked on instrumentation and operations at Lulin Observatory, and has contributed to the development of astronomy in Taiwan. || 
|-id=889
| 23889 Hermanngrassmann ||  || Hermann Grassmann (1809–1877), German mathematician, physicist, linguist, scholar, and neohumanist. His interests included Sanskrit, phonetics and theology. He was also a very inventive mathematician. His researches in noncommutative algebraic systems foreshadowed the development of the vector calculus and n-dimensional spaces. || 
|-id=890
| 23890 Quindou ||  || Sabine Quindou, French journalist, co-host of the television science program C'est pas sorcier (see also 23877, 23882) || 
|-id=893
| 23893 Lauman ||  || Stephen W. Lauman (born 1974), an instrument maker at Lowell Observatory. || 
|-id=894
| 23894 Arikahiguchi ||  || Arika Higuchi (born 1979), a Japanese theoretical astronomer. || 
|-id=895
| 23895 Akikonakamura ||  || Akiko Nakamura (born 1964), a Japanese experimentalist in the field of planetary science. || 
|-id=896
| 23896 Tatsuaki ||  || Tatsuaki Hashimoto (born 1963) works on spacecraft guidance and control at the Institute of Space and Astronautical Science, Tokyo. He was engaged in the attitude and orbit control systems of spacecraft such as the Hayabusa sample return mission to asteroid Itokawa. || 
|-id=897
| 23897 Daikuroda ||  || Kuroda Daisuke (born 1977), an astronomer at the National Astronomical Observatory of Japan. || 
|-id=898
| 23898 Takir ||  || Driss Takir (born 1973), a postdoctoral fellow in the Department of Physics and Astronomy at Ithaca College. || 
|-id=899
| 23899 Kornoš ||  || Leonard Kornoš (born 1956), a lecturer at the Comenius University in Bratislava. || 
|-id=900
| 23900 Urakawa ||  || Seitaro Urakawa (born 1975), an astronomer who works at the Bisei Spaceguard Center. || 
|}

23901–24000 

|-id=904
| 23904 Amytang ||  || Amy B. Tang, American finalist in the 2007 Discovery Channel Young Scientist Challenge (DCYSC) || 
|-id=922
| 23922 Tawadros ||  || Kyrillos Bahaa Tawadros, American finalist in the 2007 Discovery Channel Young Scientist Challenge (DCYSC) || 
|-id=924
| 23924 Premt ||  || Prem Poothatta Thottumkara, American finalist in the 2007 Discovery Channel Young Scientist Challenge (DCYSC) || 
|-id=928
| 23928 Darbywoodard ||  || Darby Elizabeth Woodard, American finalist in the 2007 Discovery Channel Young Scientist Challenge (DCYSC) || 
|-id=931
| 23931 Ibuki ||  || Ibuki Kawamoto (born 1979), an administrative associate at the Center for Computational Astrophysics. || 
|-id=937
| 23937 Delibes ||  || Léo Delibes, 19th-century French composer of ballets and operas, whose works accompanied many observing nights in the control room of the telescope with which this minor planet was discovered || 
|-id=938
| 23938 Kurosaki ||  || Hirohisa Kurosaki (born 1970), of the Japan Aerospace Explorarion Agency, works on asteroids, space debris and remote sensing. He has discovered many asteroids. || 
|-id=944
| 23944 Dusser ||  || Raymond Dusser (1933–2006), a French amateur astronomer and jazz music specialist || 
|-id=946
| 23946 Marcelleroux ||  || Marcel Le roux (born 1930), a Belgian amateur astronomer and astrophotographer || 
|-id=949
| 23949 Dazapata ||  || Danielle Zapata, American finalist in the 2007 Discovery Channel Young Scientist Challenge (DCYSC) || 
|-id=950
| 23950 Tsusakamoto ||  || Tsuyoshi Sakamoto (born 1975), a researcher at the Japan Spaceguard Association. || 
|-id=955
| 23955 Nishikota ||  || Kota Nishiyama (Nishiyama Kota, born 1965), an astronomer who works at the Bisei Spacegaurd Center of Japan || 
|-id=975
| 23975 Akran ||  || Erkan Akran, American mentor of a 2007 Discovery Channel Young Scientist Challenge (DCYSC) finalist || 
|-id=980
| 23980 Ogden ||  || Kristen Ogden, American mentor of a 2007 Discovery Channel Young Scientist Challenge (DCYSC) finalist || 
|-id=981
| 23981 Patjohnson ||  || Patricia Johnson, American mentor of a 2007 Discovery Channel Young Scientist Challenge (DCYSC) finalist || 
|-id=988
| 23988 Maungakiekie || 1999 RB || Maungakiekie (One Tree Hill), volcanic cone which dominates the skyline of Auckland, New Zealand || 
|-id=989
| 23989 Farpoint || 1999 RF || Farpoint Observatory, Kansas || 
|-id=990
| 23990 Springsteen ||  || Bruce Springsteen, American singer and songwriter (whose music entertained the discoverers on the night of discovery) || 
|-id=992
| 23992 Markhobbs ||  || Mark Hobbs, American mentor of a 2007 Discovery Channel Young Scientist Challenge (DCYSC) finalist || 
|-id=994
| 23994 Mayhan ||  || Rosemarie Mayhan, American mentor of a 2007 Discovery Channel Young Scientist Challenge (DCYSC) finalist || 
|-id=995
| 23995 Oechsle ||  || Janet Oechsle, American mentor of a 2007 Discovery Channel Young Scientist Challenge (DCYSC) finalist || 
|-id=999
| 23999 Rinner ||  || Claudine Rinner (born 1965), a French amateur astronomer and a discoverer of minor planets at Ottmarsheim Observatory. She also obtains rotational light-curves from photometric observations. || 
|-id=000
| 24000 Patrickdufour ||  || Patrick Dufour (born 1968), a French amateur astronomer and developer of tools and software for astronomy. He is working on robotics in astronomy together with Laurent Bernasconi, who discovered this minor planet. || 
|}

References 

023001-024000